"Week!" is the ninth single by Do As Infinity, released in 2001. The B-side, "Tsuredzure Naru Mama ni", is the only studio-recorded song by the guitarist Ryo Owatari, who also wrote the lyrics. The melody parallels that of song "Yesterday & Today". It was used as the theme song for the drama Yome wa Mitsuboshi.

This song was included in the band's compilation albums Do the Best and Do the A-side.

Track listing
 "Week!"
 
 "Week!" (Instrumental)
  (Instrumental)

Chart positions

External links
 "Week!" at Avex Network
 "Week!" at Oricon

2001 singles
Do As Infinity songs
Songs written by Dai Nagao
Japanese television drama theme songs
Song recordings produced by Seiji Kameda
2001 songs
Avex Trax singles